Australia is a nation that has competed at each edition of the Hopman Cup tournament since the inaugural event in 1989. Australia won the title in 1999 and 2016, and finished as the runners up in 1989 and 2003.

Players
This is a list of players who have played for Australia in the Hopman Cup.

1 Baccanello replaced Mark Philippoussis in the 2005 tie against the USA after Philippoussis suffered two tears in an adductor muscle in his groin.
2 Bradtke competed under her maiden name, Provis, in the first two of her four appearances at the event.
3 Healy played Australia's final tie in 2007 against the USA after Mark Philippoussis injured his right knee during the tie against France.
4 Reid competed in 2006 after being brought in to replace Wayne Arthurs after the first tie as Arthurs had suffered a tear in his calf muscle.
5 Wolfe competed under her maiden name, Gajdošová, in her first appearance at the event in 2012.

Results

1 Two of the losses in the final tie against Japan were walkovers, as a result of Mark Philippoussis not being able to compete in either the singles or the mixed doubles.
2 Australia was forced to forfeit the entire tie against Spain as Lleyton Hewitt was diagnosed with chickenpox.
3 In the final tie against Slovakia, Alicia Molik had to retire during her singles match and forfeit the doubles match due to a foot injury. Despite this, they finished top of their group but because of Molik's injury, did not compete in the final. 
4 Australia was represented by two teams for that year's competition.

Australia mixed team at United Cup

Overview 
Australia began its United Cup debut in 2023, in the inaugural edition of the tournament as hosts. They were paired with Great Britain and Spain in Group D, hosted in Sydney. Number one ranked ATP player, Nick Kyrgios pulled out on the eve of the competition due to injury and the number one ranked WTA player, Ajla Tomljanovic whilst still on the team list, was unable to compete in the event, also due to a knee injury. Neither player would then go on to play the 2023 Australian Open as a consequence of those injuries.

Australia's first match was against Great Britain, which they lost 2–3.

After Great Britain went on to defeat Spain, Australia then beat Spain in the final tie of the Group in which neither team could advance to the knockout stages. Australia won the tie 3–2, notably with Alex De Minaur beating Rafael Nadal in the first match of the tie.

Players

Results

References

Hopman
Hopman Cup teams